Sabino Bautista Concepción (born 30 August 1963) is a Mexican politician from the Institutional Revolutionary Party. From 2009 to 2012 he served as Deputy of the LXI Legislature of the Mexican Congress representing San Luis Potosí. He previously served as municipal president of San Martín Chalchicuautla from 2004 to 2006 before serving as a local deputy in the LVIII Legislature of the Congress of San Luis Potosí.

References

1963 births
Living people
Politicians from San Luis Potosí
Institutional Revolutionary Party politicians
21st-century Mexican politicians
Deputies of the LXI Legislature of Mexico
Members of the Chamber of Deputies (Mexico) for San Luis Potosí
Members of the Congress of San Luis Potosí
Municipal presidents in San Luis Potosí